William Grace may refer to:
William Russell Grace (1832–1904), mayor of New York and the founder of W. R. Grace and Company
W. G. Grace (William Gilbert Grace, 1848–1915), English cricketer
William M. Grace (1934–2004), casino developer
Billy Grace (1876–1938), Australian rules footballer
Willie Grace (1917–2006), American baseball player
Several of the Grace baronets

See also
Grace (surname), a list of people with the name